Tales of the Shadowmen is an American anthology of short fiction edited by Jean-Marc Lofficier and Randy Lofficier and published by Black Coat Press. The stories share the conceit of taking place in a fictional world where all of the characters and events from pulp fiction, and in particular French adventure literature, actually exist in the same universe.

About the series
The title and concept of Tales of the Shadowmen were inspired by science fiction writer Philip José Farmer's works centering on the Wold Newton family. The concept first emerged in Jean-Marc Lofficier's non-fiction works, French Science Fiction, Fantasy, Horror & Pulp Fiction: A Guide To Cinema, Television, Radio, Animation, Comic Books And Literature From The Middle Ages To The Present (2000) and Shadowmen: Heroes And Villains Of French Pulp Fiction (2003), which reviewed characters from French popular literature, the latter blending bibliographical information and speculative fiction.

Table of contents

Tales of the Shadowmen, Volume 16: Voir Dire
Featuring The Domino Lady, Fantômas, Felifax, Mowgli, Madame Palmyre, Randolph Carter, Count Saint-Germain, Captain Vampire, Joseph Rouletabille, Harry Dickson, Jean-Pierre Séverin, Doctor Eric Palmer, Arsène Lupin, Doc Ardan, Doctor Omega, the Nyctalope and the Black Coats!

Translations
French translations of Tales of the Shadowmen entitled Les Compagnons de l'Ombre were published in France by publisher Riviere Blanche starting in November 2007.

Characters A-Z

Similar pastiches
Tarzan Alive, Doc Savage: His Apocalyptic Life, The Other Log of Phileas Fogg, and the rest of the Wold Newton family stories by Philip José Farmer
Anno Dracula and sequels, by Kim Newman
The League of Heroes and sequels, by Xavier Mauméjean 
The League of Extraordinary Gentlemen by Alan Moore and Kevin O'Neill
 by Serge Lehman, Fabrice Colin and Gess (comics, Atalante editions, France)

References

External links
 The French Wold Newton Universe of Characters
 

Book series introduced in 2005
Series of books
Wold Newton family
Characters in pulp fiction